Subterranea are underground structures, both natural (such as caves) and human-made (such as mines). Some subterranea and related topics include:

Natural 
 Caves
 Cenote
 Ice cave
 Sea cave
 Sinkhole
 Karst
 Lava tube
 Lunar and Martian lava tubes
 Subterranean river
 Subterranean waterfall
 Underground lake
 Volcanic pipe

Human-made or related 
 Borehole
 Bunker
 Burial vault (tomb)
 Casemate
 Catacombs
 Cave dweller, Underground living
 Cave temple
 Cellar
 Dungeon
 Dugout (shelter)
 Fogou
 Mine
 Rock cut architecture, rock-cut tomb
 Smuggling tunnel
 Tunnels (street tunnel, train tunnels)
 Underground city, umbrella article for underground dwellings and facilities
 Underground rapid transit system
 Wine cave

See also
 Boring (earth)
 Seattle Underground
 Subterranean London